Mario Stancanelli (born 11 June 1977 in Treviso) is a retired Italian professional football player.

External links
 

1977 births
Living people
Italian footballers
A.C. Prato players
U.S. Livorno 1915 players
U.S. Triestina Calcio 1918 players
A.S. Cittadella players
Calcio Padova players
U.S. Sassuolo Calcio players
Bassano Virtus 55 S.T. players
Association football defenders